The men's parallel bars competition was one of eight events for male competitors in artistic gymnastics at the 1988 Summer Olympics in Seoul. The qualification and final rounds took place on September 18, 20 and 24th at the Olympic Gymnastics Hall. There were 89 competitors from 23 nations, with nations competing in the team event having 6 gymnasts and other nations having up to 3 gymnasts. The event was won by Vladimir Artemov of the Soviet Union, bracketing the 1984 boycott with gold medal wins for the Soviets; Valeri Liukin took silver, as well. Sven Tippelt of East Germany took bronze.

Background

This was the 17th appearance of the event, which is one of the five apparatus events held every time there were apparatus events at the Summer Olympics (no apparatus events were held in 1900, 1908, 1912, or 1920). Two of the eight finalists from 1984 returned: sixth-place finisher Li Ning of China and seventh-place finisher Daniel Winkler of West Germany. Vladimir Artemov of the Soviet Union was the reigning (1987) world champion, with his teammate Dmitry Bilozerchev runner-up and a pair of East Germans (Sven Tippelt and Sylvio Kroll) third and fourth.

Chinese Taipei made its debut in the men's parallel bars. The United States made its 15th appearance, most of any nation; the Americans had missed only the inaugural 1896 event and the boycotted 1980 Games.

Competition format

Each nation entered a team of six gymnasts or up to three individual gymnasts. All entrants in the gymnastics competitions performed both a compulsory exercise and a voluntary exercise for each apparatus. The scores for all 12 exercises were summed to give an individual all-around score. These exercise scores were also used for qualification for the apparatus finals. The two exercises (compulsory and voluntary) for each apparatus were summed to give an apparatus score. Half of the preliminary score carried over to the final. The 1984 Games had expanded the number of finalists from six to eight. Nations were still limited to two finalists each. Others were ranked 9th through 89th.

Schedule

All times are Korea Standard Time adjusted for daylight savings (UTC+10)

Results

Eighty-nine gymnasts competed in the parallel bars event during the compulsory and optional rounds on September 18 and 20. The eight highest scoring gymnasts advanced to the final on September 24. Each country was limited to two competitors in the final. Half of the points earned by each gymnast during both the compulsory and optional rounds carried over to the final. This constitutes the "prelim" score.

References

Official Olympic Report
www.gymnasticsresults.com

Men's parallel bars
Men's 1988
Men's events at the 1988 Summer Olympics